Clinical Research in Cardiology is a monthly peer-reviewed medical journal covering cardiology.

Its predecessors include the 1909-1926 Zentralblatt für Herz- und Gefässkrankheiten, the 1927-1972 Zeitschrift für Kreislaufforschung, the 1973-2005 Zeitschrift für Kardiologie (German for "Journal of Cardiology"), and it obtained its current name in 2006. It is published by Springer Science+Business Media on behalf of the German Cardiac Society, of which it is the official journal. The editors-in-chief are Michael Bohm and Hugo A. Katus. According to the Journal Citation Reports, the journal has a 2020 impact factor of 5.460.

References

External links

Cardiology journals
Publications established in 1909
Springer Science+Business Media academic journals
Monthly journals
Academic journals associated with learned and professional societies
English-language journals